Patrick "Pat" Curcio (born September 6, 1973) is a Canadian-Italian professional ice hockey coach, executive and former professional ice hockey player. Pat is now a Partner with Optima World Sports

Playing career 
Curcio played professionally in the East Coast Hockey League for the Dayton Bombers, Charlotte Checkers and Huntsville Blast and in the Colonial Hockey League for the Saginaw Wheels and Brantford Smoke.

In 1995, Curcio signed with the HC Devils Milano of Italy and had stints in the Swiss NLB with SC Herisau and in Germany in the following years. He played a total of 133 games for the Hannover Scorpions in the German top-flight Deutsche Eishockey League (DEL) and spent time with German minor league teams EV Ravensburg and ESV Bayreuth.

Coaching and managing career 
He began his career behind the bench in 2001. In the 2006–07 season, he served as head coach of the Pickering Panthers of the Ontario Junior Hockey League. From 2007 to 2009, Curcio served as assistant coach of OHL's London Knights, followed by assistant coach stints with the Utah Grizzlies (ECHL) and the Sault Sainte Marie Greyhounds (OHL).

In 2009, he organized the Euro Can Cup in London, Ontario, that included teams like EV Zug of Switzerland, EHC München of Germany and EHC Linz of Austria.

He was the Founder, President, General Manager and Head Coach of the former San Francisco Bulls Professional Hockey Team. Curcio, along with his wife Elouise, brought professional hockey back to San Francisco, when they were granted a team in the ECHL in 2011. A year later, the Bulls debuted on October 12, 2012 to a capacity crowd of 8,277 at the Cow Palace. The Bulls were the farm team of the NHL San Jose Sharks. The Bulls folded on January 27, 2014.

In the 2014-15 campaign, he was the head coach of Hockey Milano Rossoblu in the Serie A in Italy. He started the 2015–16 season as head coach of fellow Italian Serie A team HC Valpellice, but left in November 2015 to take the position as assistant coach of HC Lugano in the Swiss top-tier National League A (NLA). Curcio was promoted to Associate coach in September 2016. He has helped the team advance to 3 finals in 2 years: 2 silver Medals at Spengler Cup and the NLA Championship finals in 2016. He and head coach Doug Shedden were sacked by HCL on January 16, 2017.

In June 2017, the Italian-based EBEL Team Hockey Club Bolzano hired Curcio as head coach for the 2016–2017 season. He parted company with the club in late November 2017.

re-Hired in March 2018, by Hockey Club Bolzano to help sign the team for the 2018–2019 season as a special consultant to the GM.Curcio left the position in June 2018 to become a full time partner with Optima World Sports

Pat Curcio is now a partner with Optima World Sports. For over 25 years Optima has been representing Hockey Players in all of Europe, Asia and the KHL.

Early career

Statistics

Coaching career overview
http://www.eliteprospects.com/staff.php?staff=3469
2003-2004 Wexford Raiders AAA Asst Coach
2004-2005 Wexford Raiders AAA Head Coach
2005-2006 Toronto Redwings AAA Head Coach
2006–2007 Pickering Panthers Head Coach (OPJHL)
2007–2008 London Knights) Asst Coach
2008–2009 London Knights (OHL)* Asst Coach
2009–2010 Utah Grizzlies (ECHL)Asst Coch
2010–2011 Sault Ste. Marie Greyhounds (OHL)Asst Coach
2012–2013 San Francisco Bulls GM/ Head Coach (ECHL) San Jose Sharks affiliate NHL
2013–2014 San Francisco Bulls GM/ Head Coach (ECHL) San Jose Sharks affiliate NHL
2014–2015 Hockey Milano Rossoblu Serie A Head Coach (voted by fans coach of the year) 
2015  HC Valpellice Bulldogs (left Nov,1. 2015) Serie A Head Coach 
2015-2016 HC Lugano NLA  Asst. Coach 
2016-2017 HC Lugano NLA Asst Coach
2017- current HC Bolzano EBEL Head Coach

See also
San Francisco Bulls
Cow Palace
London Knights

References

External links
SFBulls.com
Pat Curcio: big-league determination
No bull: these things really happened
Bulls by the horns: S.F. embraces hockey

1973 births
Living people
Brantford Smoke players
Businesspeople from the San Francisco Bay Area
Buffalo Stampede players
Canadian ice hockey coaches
Charlotte Checkers (1993–2010) players
Dallas Freeze players
Dayton Bombers players
Hannover Scorpions players
HC Milano players
Huntsville Blast players
Ottawa 67's players
Prince Albert Raiders players
Ravensburg Towerstars players
Saginaw Wheels players
SC Herisau players
Ice hockey people from Toronto
Wedemark Scorpions players
Canadian ice hockey right wingers
Canadian expatriate ice hockey players in Italy